El tiempo entre costuras (literally The Time Between Seams, English title: The Time in Between) is a Spanish period drama television series produced by Boomerang TV for Antena 3. It is an adaptation of the same-titled 2009 novel by María Dueñas, published in English language under the titles The Time in Between and The Seamstress. It premiered on October 21, 2013 on Antena 3. The premiere was seen by 5.018 million people, making it the most watched premiere on Antena 3 in 12 years.

Plot
The story begins in 1934.
Between Youth and Adulthood...
Sira Quiroga is a young and attractive seamstress living a humble life in Madrid with her single mother Dolores. During a festival she meets Ignacio, an aspiring gentleman applying for a position in the Spanish civil service. They begin a relationship and soon decide to marry. Meanwhile, Dona Manuela's business is running slow, leaving her with no other option but to close down the shop, leaving all the seamstresses, including Sira and her mother, unemployed and fully reliant on Ignacio's prestigious position as a civil servant. Sira remains unemployed until Ignacio finally convinces her to apply for a civil service post, but to do this she must learn to use a typewriter.

At the typewriter shop, she falls in love with the handsome Ramiro Arribas, which puts her in a difficult predicament. After a while, unable to cope with the guilt of marrying Ignacio, she tells him she has been seeing Ramiro. Ignacio is heartbroken. He tells Dolores  about Sira's betrayal, and her mother disowns her. Sira moves in with Ramiro. After months, Dolores finds Sira with news that her long-lost father has asked to see her. They visit him together, and Sira discovers that her father is one of the wealthiest men in Madrid, Gonzalo Alvarez. When he showers her with jewels and money, Sira shares her newfound fortune with Ramiro, who suggests investing some of the money in a typewriting company in Argentina. Their investments take them to Tangier, Morocco. Sira sadly leaves her mother behind and takes a leap of faith to set off for Africa with Ramiro.

Soon, Ramiro starts wasting Sira's money on alcohol and tobacco. She has an argument with him about his money management and says she feels alone. The following day she sees a doctor as she is feeling unwell all the time, and discovers she is pregnant. Hopeful this will save her relationship, Sira hurries to their luxury apartment at the International Hotel to break the news to Ramiro, but finds the place ransacked and empty, with a letter from Ramiro saying he has decided to start a different life and has taken all Sira's money and jewels with him. In desperation Sira packs her things, leaves the hotel without a word and gets on a bus out of Tangier. On the journey she has a miscarriage and faints. She wakes up handcuffed in a hospital in Tetuoan and realizes that Ramiro never paid their bills at the hotel, leaving her with a debt of almost 2,500 French francs. The hotel gives her a year to pay before she is sent to prison. She is unable to contact her mother or return to Madrid because war has broken out there. Meanwhile, she is given shelter in Candelaria Matutera's guesthouse.

As England, Germany, and the other great powers become embroiled in the dire conflict of World War II, Sira is persuaded to return to Madrid, where she takes on a new identity to embark upon the most dangerous undertaking of her career. Thanks to her workshop, Sira meets important people like Juan Luis Beigbeder, the High Commissioner of the Protectorate; Beigbeder's mistress Rosalinda Fox, who becomes a close friend to Sira; Ramón Serrano Suñer, Francisco Franco's brother-in-law; and Alan Hillgarth, head of the British intelligence service in Spain. These people encourage Sira to become a spy, using the skills of her trade for more dangerous tasks. As the couturier of choice for an eager clientele of Nazi officers' wives, Sira becomes embroiled in a twilight world of espionage and political conspiracy rife with love, intrigue, and betrayal.

Production
The series was filmed in various locations in Spain, Morocco and Portugal. María Dueñas' original novel is set in Madrid, Tangier, Tétouan and Lisbon. Most of scenes in the series were filmed in these cities. Some of the scenes were filmed in Guadalajara and Toledo in Spain, and Estoril and Cascais in Portugal. The budget was estimated in over 500,000 euros per episode.

Cast and characters
Adriana Ugarte as Sira Quiroga aka Sira Alvarado Quiroga aka Arish Agoriuq
Elvira Mínguez as Dolores Quiroga
Raúl Arévalo as Ignacio
Tristán Ulloa as Juan Luis Beigbeder
Hannah New as Rosalinda Fox
Peter Vives as Marcus Logan
Carlos Santos as Félix Aranda
Francesc Garrido as Claudio Vázquez
Filipe Duarte as Manuel Da Silva
 as Candelaria "La Matutera"
Rubén Cortada as Ramiro Arribas
 as Ramiro Arribas (voice)
Pepa Rus as Paquita
Elena Irureta as Doña Manolita
Alba Flores as Jamila
Carlos Olalla as Gonzalo Alvarado
Ben Temple as Alan Hillgarth
 as Palomares
Jimmy Shaw as Peter Fox
Enrique Arce as Andrés
Aurora Maestre as Doña Encarna
Ángela Romanillos as Sira Quiroga (child)
Aida Ballmann as  Anika Von Fries

Soundtrack
Music score was composed by César Benito. The soundtrack album reached #2 on Spain’s iTunes Store Albums, and #1 on the Soundtracks category. It also won numerous awards, including Best Music for Television by the Academy of Sciences and Arts of Television of Spain, and is one of the most played TV soundtracks worldwide on Spotify with more than two million plays since its release.

The "Theme of Sira" from the soundtrack was used by Spanish gymnast Carolina Rodríguez in her ribbon routine since 2014, including the 2016 Summer Olympics.

List of episodes

International broadcast
The rights for El tiempo entre costuras were acquired in Italy by Canale 5; the series premiered in Italy on April 25, 2014 as Il tempo del coraggio e dell'amore (The Time of Courage and Love) and aired with an average of 3.4 million viewers (14% share). In Portugal, the series aired on TVI. In Japan, the series premiered in June 2015 on NHK General TV as Jonetsu no Shira (Sira's Passion). The rights for the series have also been acquired in China (CCTV-8), Taiwan (PTS), Hungary (MTVA), Croatia (RTL Televizija) or Chile (TVN), among others.

This series is also available on Netflix in the USA on their streaming services.

Awards and nominations 

|-
| align = "center" rowspan = 16 | 2014 || rowspan = 4 | Actors Union Awards || Best Leading Actress || Adriana Ugarte ||  || rowspan = 4 | 
|-
| Best Supporting Actress || Elvira Mínguez || 
|-
| Best Supporting Actor || Carlos Santos || 
|-
| Best Actor in a Minor Role || Tristán Ulloa || 
|-
| rowspan = 8 | 17th  || colspan = 2 | Best Fiction ||  || rowspan = 8 | 
|-
| Best Actor || Peter Vives || 
|-
| Best Actress || Adriana Ugarte || 
|-
| Best Direction || , Iñaki Peñafiel and Norberto L. Amado || 
|-
| Best Production || Gregorio Quintana, Ángeles Caballero, Emilio Pina and Reyes Baltanás || 
|-
| Best Cinematography Direction and Lighting || Juan Molina Temboury || 
|-
| Best Art Direction and Scenography || Luis Vallés and Bina Daigeler || 
|-
| Best Music for TV || César Benito || 
|-
| 61st Ondas Awards || Best Actress in Spanish Fiction || Adriana Ugarte ||  || 
|-
| rowspan = 3 | 2nd  || colspan = "2" | Best Miniseries ||  || rowspan = 3 | 
|-
| Best Actress || Adriana Ugarte || 
|-
| Best Direction || Iñaki Mercero, Iñaki Peñafiel and Norberto López Amado ||

References

External links
 
 Official website

2013 Spanish television series debuts
2014 Spanish television series endings
2010s Spanish drama television series
Espionage television series
Serial drama television series
Television series about the history of Spain
Television series based on Spanish novels
Television series set in the 1930s
Television series set in the 1940s
Television shows set in Morocco
Television shows set in Portugal
Television shows set in Madrid
Antena 3 (Spanish TV channel) network series
Television series by Boomerang TV